Peter Wessels was the defending champion but lost in the second round to James Blake.

Neville Godwin won in the final 6–1, 6–4 against Martin Lee.

Seeds
A champion seed is indicated in bold text while text in italics indicates the round in which that seed was eliminated.

  Vladimir Voltchkov (first round)
  Rainer Schüttler (quarterfinals)
  Davide Sanguinetti (quarterfinals)
  Antony Dupuis (first round)
  Lars Burgsmüller (first round)
  Gianluca Pozzi (first round)
  Jan Siemerink (first round)
  Andrei Stoliarov (first round)

Draw

References
 2001 Miller Lite Hall of Fame Championships Draw

2001 Hall of Fame Tennis Championships